Vegetable Market Workers Union, a trade union in Andhra Pradesh, India. VMWU is affiliated to the All India Trade Union Congress. The president of VMWU is Moulana.

Trade unions in India
All India Trade Union Congress
Trade unions in Andhra Pradesh
Year of establishment missing